Chrysotype (also known as a chripotype or gold print) is a photographic process invented by John Herschel in 1842. Named from the Greek for "gold", it uses colloidal gold to record images on paper.

Processes

Herschel's process 
Herschel's system involved coating paper with ferric citrate, exposing it to the sun in contact with an etching used as mask, then developing the print with a chloroaurate solution. This did not provide continuous-tone photographs. 

In 2006, 164 years after Herschel's work with gold printing, photographers Liam Lawless and Robert Wolfgang Schramm published a formula based on Herschel's process.

Processes based on ziatype 
Following the introduction of Richard Sullivan's ziatype process in 1997, which uses ammonium ferric oxalate to print out palladium images, many photographers began experimenting successfully with substituting gold for some or all of the palladium. Image quality decays rapidly as the printer approaches 100% gold in a ziatype print.

Puckett's process 
Richard Puckett, an American photographer, announced in the March/April 2012 issue of View Camera magazine a chrysotype process that uses ascorbate with ammonium ferric oxalate to print out on dry paper, with no hydration, fine-grained, continuous tone gold images. Puckett presented the process at the 2013 APIS (Alternative Photography International Symposium) in Santa Fe, New Mexico. Originally the process was named the Texas Chrystoype; following a major revision of the formula in 2017, Puckett renamed the process the Chrysotype Supreme.

Literature 
The modern chemist and photographic historian Mike Ware published the first books covering the subject of chrysotype in 2006, The Chrysotype Manual: the science and practice of photographic printing in gold and Gold in Photography: the history and art of chrysotype.

References

External links
The Chrysotype Supreme Formula by Richard Puckett
Texas Chrysotype Formula by Richard Puckett
Chrysotype Books by Mike Ware
The Texas Revolution in Gold: Online Article
A palladium and gold printing out and development system
Prints of Gold: the Chrysotype Process Re-invented
Photographic Printing in Colloidal Gold Ware, M. The Journal of Photographic Science 42 (5) 157-161 (1994).
Practical Printing with Colloidal Gold

Photographic processes dating from the 19th century